District Court is in Norway called Tingrett

List of District Courts in Norway 
A
 Alstahaug District Court
 Alta District Court
 Asker og Bærum District Court
 Aust-Agder District Court
 Aust-Telemark District Court

B
 Bergen District Court
 Brønnøy District Court

D
 Dalane District Court
 Drammen District Court

E
 Eiker, Modum og Sigdal District Court

F
 Fjordane District Court
 Follo District Court
 Fosen District Court
 Fredrikstad District Court

G
 Gjøvik District Court
 Glåmdal District Court

H
 Hadeland og Land District Court
 Halden District Court
 Hallingdal District Court
 Hammerfest District Court
 Hardanger District Court
 Haugaland District Court
 Hedmarken District Court
 Heggen og Frøland District Court

I
 Inderøy District Court
 Indre Finnmark District Court
 Indre Follo District Court
 Inntrøndelag District Court

J
 Jæren District Court

K
 Kongsberg District Court
 Kristiansand District Court

L
 Larvik District Court
 Lister District Court
 Lofoten District Court

M
 Moss District Court

N
 Namdal District Court
 Nedre Romerike District Court
 Nedre Telemark District Court
 Nord-Gudbrandsdal District Court
 Nord-Troms District Court
 Nord-Østerdal District Court
 Nordhordland District Court
 Nordmøre District Court
 Nordre Vestfold District Court

O
 Ofoten District Court
 Oslo District Court

R
 Rana District Court
 Ringerike District Court
 Romsdal District Court
 Ryfylke District Court

S
 Salten District Court
 Sandefjord District Court
 Sandnes District Court
 Sarpsborg District Court
 Senja District Court
 Sogn District Court
 Stavanger District Court
 Stjør- og Verdal District Court
 Sunnhordland District Court
 Sunnmøre District Court
 Sør-Gudbrandsdal District Court
 Sør-Trøndelag District Court
 Sør-Østerdal District Court
 Søre Sunnmøre District Court

T
 Toten District Court
 Trondenes District Court
 Trondheim District Court
 Tønsberg District Court

V
 Valdres District Court
 Vest-Telemark District Court
 Vesterålen District Court

Y
 Ytre Follo District Court

Ø
 Øst-Finnmark District Court
 Øvre Romerike District court

References